Leslie Harris may refer to:

Leslie Harris (lawyer), president and chief executive officer of the Center for Democracy and Technology
Leslie Harris (Welsh cricketer) (1915–1985), Welsh cricketer
Leslie Harris (Barbadian cricketer) (1920-2007), Barbadian cricketer
Leslie Harris (director) (born 1960), American film director, screenwriter and producer
Leslie Harris (motorcyclist)
Les Harris (businessman) (Leslie Harris, 1939–2009), Torquay businessman and motorcycle enthusiast
Leslie M. Harris, American historian and scholar

See also
Lesley Harris (born 1954), badminton player
Les Harris (disambiguation)